Saint Thomas of Canterbury church is a church serving the Catholic population of Newport, Isle of Wight, UK. It was the first purpose-built Catholic church constructed after the Protestant reformation on the island. The Roman Catholic Relief Act of 1791 placed restrictions on the design of Catholic places of worship. For this reason there is no steeple, bell, or anything else that made a building look like a church building of the state religion, the Church of England. This means the building looks quite plain from the outside.

References 

Roman Catholic churches on the Isle of Wight
Newport, Isle of Wight